= Dolgorukov House in Kolpachniy Lane =

Coordinates: 55.7578603°N 37.64126992°E

- Дом Долгоруковых в Колпачном переулке
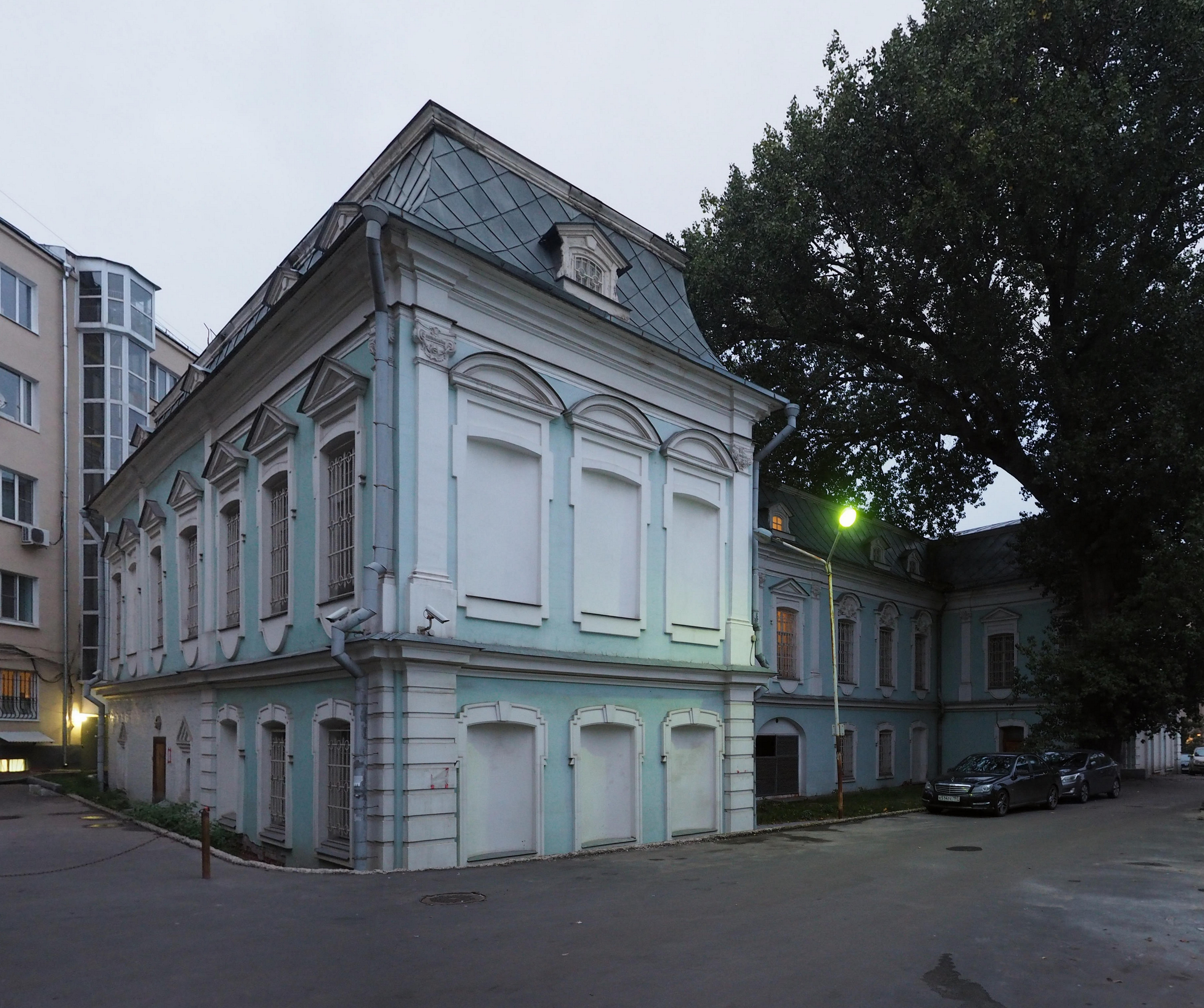
- Interactive map of Dolgorukov House in Kolpachniy Lane
- Location: Moscow, Kolpachny Lane, Building 6, Building 2

The Dolgorukov House in Kolpachniy Lane (Russian: Дом Долгоруковых в Колпачном переулке) is a mansion in the center of Moscow (Kolpachny Lane, Building 6, Building 2). Built in 1764 in the Baroque style on the basis of the chambers of the XVII century. It has the status of an object of cultural heritage of federal significance.

== History ==
The western part of the house includes chambers of the 17th century. Their façade is oriented to the west and went out onto a lane that has not survived to this day. The chambers of the 17th century are built on a white-stone basement of the 16th century, which has survived to our time. The entrance to this sublet is oriented to the south, where the royal Starosadsky Palace used to be. According to the assumption of R. E. Rakhmatullin, the 16th-century basement could be part of the Lithuanian embassy court in 1560.

At the beginning of the 18th century, the owners of the chambers were Khitrovo, and then Buturlin. From 1738, the chambers belonged to Prince Konstantin Stepanovich Kantakuzen. Around the 1730s-1740s the chambers were reconstructed, having received a decor in the Annensk style. In 1744, Kantakuzen was purchased by Prince Alexander Alekseevich Dolgorukov. Later, Dolgorukov acquired two adjacent sites, and then began restructuring the chambers with a significant increase in their volume. The author of the project of reorganization is the architect Vasily Yakovlevich Yakovlev, as evidenced by the surviving drawings. The restructuring of the Chambers ended in 1764. Now the main facade was oriented towards the Church of the Assumption on Pokrovka, towards which there was a grand entrance driveway. Along Pokrovka there was also a parade fence with lions holding chains in their mouths.

After perestroika, a coach carriage was made in the center of the mansion, separating the old part of the building from the new one. Guests could enter the building on carriages, and from the middle of the passage the side staircases led to the grand entrance hall with columns and sculptures.

The mansion was not damaged during the fire of 1812, and Napoleon placed in it the central office of the French police. In September 1812, a trial took place over the Russian arsonists in Moscow.

In the early 1930s a multi-storey residential building was built nearby, because of the angle of the oldest part of the mansion was dismantled. In 1997, the restoration of Dolgorukov's house was carried out, however, the elevator shaft of the residential building did not allow to completely restore the corner of the mansion. Restorers have restored the former main façade of the 17th century chambers, highlighting it in white. On the southern facade a pale yellow color shows the restructuring of 1730s and 1740s.
